is a passenger railway station in located in the city of Miyazu, Kyoto Prefecture, Japan, operated by the private railway company Willer Trains (Kyoto Tango Railway).

Lines
Amanohashidate Station is a station of the Miyazu Line, and is located 29.1 kilometers from the terminus of the line at Nishi-Maizuru Station.

Station layout
The station consists of one ground-level side platform and one ground-level island platform connected by a footbridge. The station is attended.

Adjacent stations

History
The station was opened on July 31, 1925.

Passenger statistics
In fiscal 2019, the station was used by an average of 437 passengers daily.

Surrounding area
 Ama-no-Hashidate
Amahashiyama Chionji Temple
Amanohashidate Sightseeing Boat

See also
List of railway stations in Japan

References

External links

Official home page 

Railway stations in Kyoto Prefecture
Railway stations in Japan opened in 1925
Miyazu, Kyoto